University College Cork – National University of Ireland, Cork (UCC) is a constituent university of the National University of Ireland, and located in Cork.

The university was founded in 1845 as one of three Queen's Colleges located in Belfast, Cork, and Galway.  It became University College, Cork, under the Irish Universities Act of 1908. The Universities Act 1997 renamed the university as National University of Ireland, Cork, and a Ministerial Order of 1998 renamed the university as University College Cork – National University of Ireland, Cork, though it continues to be almost universally known as University College Cork.

Amongst other rankings and awards, the university was named Irish University of the Year by The Sunday Times on five occasions; most recently in 2017. In 2015, UCC was also named as top performing university by the European Commission funded U-Multirank system, based on obtaining the highest number of "A" scores (21 out of 28 metrics) among a field of 1200 partaking universities. UCC also became the first university to achieve the ISO 50001 standard in energy management in 2011.

History

Queen's College, Cork, was founded by the provisions of an act which enabled Queen Victoria to endow new colleges for the "Advancement of Learning in Ireland". Under the powers of this act, the three colleges of Belfast, Cork and Galway were incorporated on 30 December 1845. The college opened in 1849 with 23 professors and 181 students; Medicine, Arts, and Law were the three founding faculties. A year later the college became part of the Queen's University of Ireland.

The original site chosen for the college was considered appropriate as it was believed to have had a connection with the patron saint of Cork, Saint Finbarr. His monastery and school of learning were close by at Gill Abbey Rock and the mill attached to the monastery is thought to have stood on the bank of the south channel of the River Lee, which runs through the college lower grounds. This association is also reflected in the college motto "Where Finbarr Taught, Let Munster Learn" which is also the university motto.

Adjacent to Gillabbey and overlooking the valley of the river Lee, the site was selected in 1846. The Tudor Gothic quadrangle and early campus buildings were designed and built by Sir Thomas Deane (1792-1871) and Benjamin Woodward (1816-1861). Queen's College Cork officially opened its doors in November 1849, with further buildings added later, including the Medical/Windle Building in the 1860s.

National University of Ireland
In the following century, the Irish Universities Act (1908) formed the National University of Ireland, consisting of the three constituent colleges of Dublin, Cork and Galway, and the college was given the status of a university college as University College, Cork. The Universities Act, 1997, made the university college a constituent university of the National University and made the constituent university a full university for all purposes except the awarding of degrees and diplomas which remains the sole remit of the National University.

Today

As of 2016, University College Cork (UCC) had 21,000 students. These included 15,000 in undergraduate programmes, 4,400 in postgraduate study and research, and 2,800 in adult continuing education across undergraduate, postgraduate and short courses. The student base is supported by 2,800 academic, research and administrative staff. As of 2017, UCC reportedly had 150,000 alumni worldwide.

Campus
Student numbers, at over 21,000 in 2016, increased from the late 1980s, precipitating the expansion of the campus by the acquisition of adjacent buildings and lands. This expansion continued with the opening of the Alfred O'Rahilly building in the late 1990s, the Cavanagh Pharmacy building, the Brookfield Health Sciences centre, the extended Áras na MacLéinn (Devere Hall), the Lewis Glucksman Gallery in 2004, Experience UCC (Visitors' Centre) and an extension to the Boole Library – named for the first professor of mathematics at UCC, George Boole, who developed the algebra that would later make computer programming possible. The university also completed the Western Gateway Building in 2009 on the site of the former Cork Greyhound track on the Western Road as well as refurbishment to the Tyndall institute buildings at the Lee Maltings Complex. In 2016, UCC acquired the Cork Savings Bank building on Lapps Quay in the centre of Cork city. As of 2017, the university is rolling out a programme to increase the space across its campuses, with part of this development involving the creation of a 'student hub' to support academic strategy, to add 600 new student accommodation spaces, and to develop an outdoor sports facility. 

The School of Biological, Earth and Environmental Sciences is based on the North Mall Campus, the site of the former North Mall Distillery.

Since 1986, 2.5 tonnes of uranium rods have been stored in the basement of the UCC physics department. The uranium was originally given to Ireland by the US as part of the Atoms for Peace programme, however due to public opposition, the reactor was dismantled during the 1980s. As there is no nuclear waste site in Ireland, the uranium remains on campus.

In 2006, the university re-opened the Crawford Observatory, a structure built in 1880 on the grounds of the university by Sir Howard Grubb. Grubb, son of the Grubb telescope building family in Dublin, designed the observatory and built the astronomical instruments for the structure. The university paid for an extensive restoration and conservation of the building and the three main telescopes, the Equatorial, the Transit Circle and Sidereostatic telescopes.

In November 2009, a number of UCC buildings were damaged by flooding. The floods also affected other parts of Cork City, with many students being evacuated from accommodation. The college authorities postponed academic activities for a week, and indicated that it would take until 2010 before all flood damaged property would be repaired. Particularly impacted was the newly opened Western Gateway Building, with the main lecture theatre requiring a total refit just months after opening for classes.

In 2018, UCC's campus became home to the first "plastic free" café in Ireland, with the opening of the Bio Green Café in the Biosciences building.

Research
The university is one of Ireland's leading research institutes, with among the highest research income in the state. In 2016, UCC secured research funding of over €96 million, a 21% increase over a five-year period and a high for the university. The university had seven faculties: Arts and Celtic Studies, Commerce, Engineering, Food Science and Technology, Law, Medicine, and Science. Between 2005 and 2006 the university was restructured from these seven faculties into four colleges: Arts, Celtic Studies and Social Science; Business and Law; Medicine and Health; and Science, Engineering and Food Science.

According to the 2009-2012 UCC Strategic plan, UCC aimed to enhance research and innovation. In 2009, the university was ranked in the top 3% of universities worldwide for research.

UCC's published research strategy proposed to create "Centres of Excellence" for "world class research" in which the researchers and research teams would be given "freedom and flexibility to pursue their areas of research". Research centres in UCC cover a range of areas including: Nanoelectronics with the Tyndall Institute; Food and Health with the Alimentary Pharmabiotic Centre, NutraMara, Food for Health Ireland Research Centre, and Cereal Science Cork; the Environment with the Environmental Research Institute (with research in biodiversity, aquaculture, energy efficiency and ocean energy); and Business Information Systems.

The Sunday Times "Good University Guide 2015", put UCC at the top of their rankings for "research income per academic".

In October 2008, the governing body of the university announced that UCC would be the first institution in Ireland to use embryonic stem cells in research under strict guidelines of the University Research Ethics using imported hESCs from approved jurisdictions. In 2009, Professor of Mathematics at UCC, Des McHale, challenged the university's decision to allow embryonic stem cell research. According to the results of a poll conducted by irishhealth.com, almost two in three people supported the decision made by University College Cork to allow embryonic stem cell research.

In 2016, Professor Noel Caplice, director of the centre for research in Vascular Biology at UCC and a cardiologist at Cork University Hospital, announced a "major breakthrough in the field of blood vessel replacement".

Campus companies
The university has a number of related companies including: Cytrea, which is involved in pharmaceutical formulations; Firecomms, an ICT company concentrating on optical communications; Alimentary Health a biotech healthcare company; Biosensia who develop integrated micro-system analytical chips; Sensl, part of ON Semiconductor; Luxcel which is involved in the development of probes and sensors; and Optical Metrology Innovations which develops laser metrology systems.

Knowledge transfer
Innovation and Knowledge transfer is driven by UCC's Office of Technology Transfer, an office of the university dedicated to commercialising aspects of UCC's research and connecting researchers with industry. Recent spin outs from the college include pharmaceutical company Glantreo, Luxcel Biosciences, Alimentary Health, Biosensia, Firecoms, Gourmet Marine, Keelvar, Lee Oncology, and Sensl.

Commemorative events
In 2015, the university marked the bicentenary of mathematician, philosopher and logician George Boole - UCC's first professor of mathematics. In September 2017, UCC unveiled a €350 million investment plan, with university president, Professor Patrick O’Shea, outlining the development goals for UCC in the areas of philanthropy and student recruitment. The plan proposes to provide for curriculum development, an increase in national and international student numbers, the extension of the campus and an increase in the income earned from philanthropy.

The Minister for Culture, Heritage & the Gaeltacht and Chair of the National Famine Commemoration Committee, Heather Humphreys TD, also announced that 2018's National Famine Commemoration is planned to take place in UCC. Cork University Press published The Atlas of the Great Irish Famine in 2012. Subsequently, in September 2017, The Atlas of the Irish Revolution was published by Cork University Press. In November 2017, UCC's MSc Information Systems for Business Performance (ISBP) was named "Postgraduate Course of the Year - IT" at the gradireland Higher Education Awards in Dublin.

Reputation
University College Cork has been ranked by a number of bodies, and was named as the "Irish University of the Year" by the Sunday Times in 2003, 2005, 2011 and 2016, and was a runner up in the 2015 edition. In 2015, UCC was also named as top performing university by the European Commission funded U-Multirank system, based on a high number of "A" scores (21 out of 28 metrics) among a field of 1200 partaking universities. Also in 2015, the CWTS Leiden Ranking placed UCC 1st in Ireland, 16th in Europe and 52nd globally from a field of 750 universities. The 2011 QS World University Rankings assigned a 5-star rating to UCC, and ranked the university amongst the top 2% of universities worldwide. UCC was ranked 230th in the 2014 edition of the QS World University Rankings. 13 of its subject areas featured in the QS World University Rankings by Subject 2015 (up from 10 subject areas in 2014), including the Pharmacy & Pharmacology disciplines, which were listed with the top 50 worldwide. 
The Universitas Indonesia (UI) Greenmetric World University Ranking awarded UCC a second in the world ranking for the second year in a row in 2015 for its efforts in the area of sustainability, with 360 universities from 62 countries ranked overall.

UCC has been recognised for its digital and social media presence, winning the 'Best Social Media Engagement' category at the 2014 Social Media Awards, and as a finalist in two categories at the 2015 Social Media Awards. A previous finalist at the 2013 and 2014 Web Awards, UCC also made the 2015 finals in two categories, 'Most Influential Irish Website Ever' and 'Best Education and Third Level Website'. University College Cork had the first website in Ireland in 1991 (only the ninth website in the world at the time), serving transcriptions of Irish historical and literary documents for the CELT project converted from SGML to HTML.

It was reported in December 2020 that UCC had spent €76,265.38 investigating sexual harassment claims over the previous five years. This represented the largest amount spent by a third-level institution in Ireland during that period. UCC spent €24,460.50 on legal fees in the years 2017 and 2018, and paid out €510 in 2018.

Academic units

College of Medicine and Health
Medicine, Arts, and Law were the three founding faculties when Queen's College Cork opened its doors to students in 1849. The medical buildings were built in stages between 1860 and 1880, and the faculty quickly gained a reputation for the quality of its graduates. The first two women to graduate in medicine in Ireland did so in 1898 (this was notable as it was more than 20 years before women were permitted to sit for medicine at the University of Oxford). UCC School of Medicine is part of the College of Medicine and Health, and is based at the Brookfield Health Sciences Centre on the main UCC campus and is affiliated with the 1000-bed University College Cork Teaching Hospital, which is the largest medical centre in Ireland. The UCC School Of Pharmacy is based in the Cavanagh Pharmacy Building.

Centre for Architectural Education
The Cork Centre for Architectural Education (CCAE) is the Department of Architecture at UCC, and is a school jointly run with Munster Technological University. It is accredited by the Royal Institute of the Architects of Ireland.

Humanities
The College of Arts, Celtic Studies and Social Sciences (CACSSS) incorporates a number of schools.

UCC is home to the Irish Institute of Chinese Studies, which allows students to study Chinese culture as well as the language through Arts and Commerce. The department won the European Award for Languages in 2008.

As of 2017, Digital Humanities had grown as a discipline, with 26 PhD research students working on various Digital Humanities projects. UCC's programme for students in Digital Humanities includes BA (Hons) Digital Humanities & Information Technology, MA Digital Arts & Humanities and PhD Digital Arts & Humanities.

Student life

Clubs, societies and representation
University College Cork has over 100 active societies and 50 different sports clubs. There are academic, charitable, creative, gaming/role-playing, political, religious, and social societies and clubs incorporating field sports, martial arts, watersports as well outdoor and indoor team and individual sports. UCC clubs are sponsored by Bank of Ireland, with the UCC Skull and Crossbones as the mascot for all UCC sports teams. 100 students received scholarships in 26 different sports in 2010.

The regular activities of UCC's societies include charity work; with over €100,000 raised annually by the Surgeon Noonan society, €10,000 raised by the War Gaming and Role Playing Society (WARPS) through its international gaming convention Warpcon, €10,000 raised by the UCC Law Society for the Cambodia orphanage and the UCC Pharmacy Society supports the Cork Hospitals Children's Club every year with a number of events. UCC societies also sometimes attract high-profile speakers such as Robert Fisk who addressed the Law Society, Nick Leeson, and Senator David Norris, who was the 2009/2010 honorary president of the UCC Philosophical Society.

An Chuallacht (meaning "The Fellowship") is UCC's Irish language and culture society. Founded in 1912, this society promotes the Irish language, and was awarded the Glór na nGael "Irish Society of the Year Award" in 2009.

The UCC Students' Union (UCCSU) acts as the representative body of the 17,000 students attending UCC. Each student is automatically a member by virtue of a student levy.

Student accommodation
Accommodation for students is offered by UCC through a subsidiary company known as Campus Accommodation UCC DAC. UCC operate 5 accommodation complexes, including the Castlewhite Apartments (63 apartments/298 beds), Mardyke Hall (14 apartments/48 beds),

In February 2020, UCC announced their decision to raise rent in the 2020/21 academic term by three-percent over the 2019/20 academic term rate. The announcement came after similar rent increases in university-owned accommodation throughout the country, and after increases in previous years to the rent of UCC-owned accommodation. This decision was met with backlash from student representatives, UCC staff, and local politicians. On 25 February 2020, the UCC Students' Union launched a campaign which demanded that UCC reverse the increase. A group of over 300 UCC staff members signed a petition in solidarity with the Students' Union. Several members of Cork County Council also expressed opposition to the decision. In early March 2020, a spokesperson for the university said the increase was necessary due to refurbishment works, and a rise in security and maintenance costs.

International students
The largest number of the 2,400 international students at UCC in 2010 came from the United States, followed by China, France and Malaysia. UCC participates in the Erasmus program with 439 students visiting UCC in 2009–2010. 201 UCC students studied in institutions in the United States, China and Europe in the same period.

UCC was rated highly in the 2008 International Student Barometer report. This survey polled 67,000 international students studying at 84 institutions, and was carried out by the International Insight Group. The report held that 98% of UCC's international students (who participated in the survey) reported having "Expert Lecturers". And over 90% of these students said that they had "Good Teachers". In 3 categories of the survey, "sports facilities", "social facilities" and "university clubs and societies", UCC was in the top three of the 84 Institutions that took part in the survey. UCC's International Education Office was given a 93% satisfaction rating and UCC's IT Support was given a 92% satisfaction rating.

Notable alumni

Notable alumni of the university include graduates from different disciplines.

In arts and literature, alumni include novelist Seán Ó Faoláin, short-story writer Daniel Corkery, composers Aloys Fleischmann, Seán Ó Riada, musicologist Ita Beausang, musician Julie Feeney, author, academic and critic Robert Anthony Welch, actors Fiona Shaw and Siobhán McSweeney, novelist and poet William Wall, poets Paul Durcan, John Mee, Liam Ó Muirthile, Nuala Ní Dhomhnaill, Trevor Joyce, Thomas McCarthy, Theo Dorgan, and Greg Delanty, singer SEARLS, comedian Des Bishop, and journalists Brendan O'Connor, Ian Bailey, Samantha Barry, Stefanie Preissner and Eoghan Harris. Actor Cillian Murphy and BBC presenter Graham Norton both attended UCC but did not graduate.

From the business community, alumni include Kerry Group's Denis Brosnan, Kingfisher plc's former CEO Gerry Murphy, former heads of CRH Anthony Barry and Myles Lee.

In medicine, alumni include Sir Edwin John Butler, Charles Donovan, Sir Bertram Windle, Dr. Paul Whelton, and Dr. Pixie McKenna, doctor and TV presenter.

In physics, alumni include Professor Margaret Murnane of the University of Colorado, Professor Patrick G. O'Shea of the University of Maryland, and Professor Séamus Davis of Cornell.

In mathematics alumni include Irish mathematicians Seán Dineen, an expert in complex analysis, and Des MacHale, a leading researcher on George Boole,.

Politicians and public servants that attended UCC include current Taoiseach Micheál Martin, former Taoiseach Jack Lynch, Supreme Court justice Liam McKechnie, High Court judge Bryan MacMahon. André Ventura, founder of the Portuguese political party Chega, attended UCC as a graduate student.

In religious communities alumni have included the Church of Ireland Bishop of Cork, Cloyne and Ross, Dr Paul Colton, the first UCC graduate to be a Church of Ireland bishop. Some members of the Saint Patrick's Society for the Foreign Missions (Kiltegan Fathers) took their civil degrees in UCC, including Derek John Christopher Byrne, Catholic Bishop in Brazil, Maurice Anthony Crowley SPS in Kenya, John Alphonsus Ryan Bishop in Malawi, and John Magee who served as Bishop of Cloyne. Bishop of Kerry, Raymond Browne, holds a science degree from UCC.

In sport, rugby coach Declan Kidney, Gaelic footballers Séamus Moynihan, Maurice Fitzgerald and Billy Morgan, hurlers Pat Heffernan, Joe Deane, James "Cha" Fitzpatrick and Ray Cummins, rugby players Edwin Edogbo, Moss Keane, Ronan O'Gara and Donnacha Ryan, and Olympian Lizzie Lee have all attended UCC.

Notable academics

George Boole was the first professor of mathematics at UCC. He developed Boolean algebra that would later make computer programming possible.
 Aloys Fleischmann, composer and musicologist, was professor of music 1934–1980
 Michael Grimes, first UCC Professor of Microbiology
 Máire Herbert MRIA, historian of early medieval Ireland
 Mary Ryan, the first woman in Ireland or Great Britain to be a university professor, was a professor of romance languages at UCC
Eoin O'Reilly, researcher of optoelectronics and strained-layer laser structures

List of presidents

 1845 to 1873: Sir Robert Kane; first president
 1873 to 1890: William Kirby Sullivan
 1890 to 1896: James W. Slattery
 1897 to 1904: Sir Rowland Blennerhassett
 1904 to 1919: Bertram Windle
 1919 to 1943: Patrick J. Merriman
 1943 to 1954: Alfred O'Rahilly
 1954 to 1963: Henry St John Atkins
 1964 to 1967: John J. McHenry
 1967 to 1978: Donal McCarthy
 1978 to 1988: Tadhg Ó Ciardha
 1989 to 1999: Michael Mortell
 1999 to 2007: Gerard Wrixon
 2007 to 2017: Michael Murphy
 2017 to 2020: Patrick G. O'Shea
 2021 to Present: John O'Halloran

Arms

See also
 Cork University Press
 Education in the Republic of Ireland
 Intel Outstanding Researcher Award
 List of Irish organizations with royal patronage
 List of modern universities in Europe (1801–1945)
 UCC GAA
 UCC Students' Union
 Intel Outstanding Researcher Award

References

Further reading
 Parkes, H.M. 1953. Some notes on the herbarium of University College, Cork. Ir. Nat. J. ll: 102 – 106.
Murphy, John A. 1995. The College: A History of Queen’s / University College Cork. Cork: Cork University Press. ISBN 1 85918 056 6

External links

Students' Union
Cork University Press
Annual Reports of President of Queen's College, Cork: 1849–51; 1851–1900; 1901–1909

 
Buildings and structures in Cork (city)
Educational institutions established in 1845
Education in Cork (city)
Cork
Tourist attractions in Cork (city)
1845 establishments in Ireland
Organisations based in Cork (city)